The Space Age is a BBC Books original novel written by Steve Lyons and based on the long-running British science fiction television series Doctor Who. It features the Eighth Doctor, Fitz and Compassion.

References

External links
The Cloister Library - The Space Age

2000 British novels
2000 science fiction novels
Eighth Doctor Adventures
Novels by Steve Lyons